Beevor as a surname may refer to:

Antony Beevor (born 1946), British historian
Charles Edward Beevor (1854–1908), English neurologist and anatomist
Beevor's axiom, the idea that the brain does not know muscles, only movements
Beevor's sign, characteristic of some types of spinal cord injury
Humphry Beevor (1903–1965), 7th Bishop of Lebombo, Mozambique
James Rigby Beevor (1811–1849), English colonist and pastoralist of South Australia, after whom Mount Beevor is named
John Beevor (1845-1903), English first-class cricketer
Miles Beevor (1900–1994), English solicitor, pilot and businessman
Beevor baronets, created in 1784 for the prominent agriculturalist Thomas Beevor

See also 
Beauvois

English toponymic surnames